"Ghost Town" is a song by the British two-tone band the Specials, released on 12 June 1981. The song spent three weeks at number one and 11 weeks in total in the top 40 of the UK Singles Chart.

Evoking themes of urban decay, deindustrialisation, unemployment and violence in inner cities, the song is remembered for being a hit at the same time as riots were occurring in British cities. Internal tensions within the band were also coming to a head when the single was being recorded, resulting in the song being the last single recorded by the original seven members of the group before splitting up. However, the song was hailed by the contemporary UK music press as a major piece of popular social commentary, and all three of the major UK music magazines of the time awarded "Ghost Town" the accolade of "Single of the Year" for 1981. It was the 12th-best-selling single in the UK in 1981.

Background
The tour for the group's More Specials album in late 1980 had been a fraught experience: already tired from a long touring schedule and with several band members at odds with keyboardist and band leader Jerry Dammers over his decision to incorporate "muzak" keyboard sounds on the album, several of the gigs descended into audience violence. As they travelled around the country the band witnessed sights that summed up the depressed mood of a country gripped by recession. In 2002 Dammers told The Guardian, "You travelled from town to town and what was happening was terrible. In Liverpool, all the shops were shuttered up, everything was closing down ... We could actually see it by touring around. You could see that frustration and anger in the audience. In Glasgow, there were these little old ladies on the streets selling all their household goods, their cups and saucers. It was unbelievable. It was clear that something was very, very wrong."

In an interview in 2011, Dammers explained how witnessing this event inspired his composition:

The song's sparse lyric alludes to urban decay, unemployment and violence in inner cities. Jo-Ann Greene of Allmusic notes the lyric "only brush[es] on the causes for this apocalyptic vision — the closed down clubs, the numerous fights on the dancefloor, the spiraling unemployment, the anger building to explosive levels. But so embedded were these in the British psyche, that Dammers needed only a minimum of words to paint his picture." The club referred to in the song was the Locarno (run by the Mecca Leisure Group and later renamed Tiffanys), a regular haunt of Neville Staple and Lynval Golding, and which is also named as the club in "Friday Night, Saturday Morning", one of the songs on the B-side. The building which housed the club is now Coventry Central Library.

Recording
In March 1981, Jerry Dammers heard the reggae song "At the Club" by actor and singer Victor Romero Evans played on Roundtable, the singles review show on BBC Radio 1. Fascinated by the record's sound, Dammers telephoned the song's co-writer and producer John Collins a few days later, although as Dammers first phone call was in the middle of the night, Collins initially took it to be a joke. Following further conversations with Dammers, Collins travelled up from his home in London to meet the Specials at their rehearsal studio and agreed to produce their new single.

After becoming overwhelmed with the multitude of choices available in the 24-track studio used during the recording of More Specials, Dammers had decided that he wanted to return a more basic set-up, and after a recommendation from bass player Horace Panter who was familiar with the place, the band chose the small 8-track studio in the house owned by John Rivers in Woodbine Street in Royal Leamington Spa. The studio, which consisted of a recording space in the cellar and a control room in the living room, was too small to accommodate all the members of the band, so rather than their normal recording method of playing all together, Collins recorded each band member playing one at a time and built up the songs track by track.

The three songs for the single were recorded over ten days in April 1981 in two separate sessions at Woodbine Street: seven days from 3 to 9 April and then a further three days from 15 to 17 April. Tensions were high during the recording of the single, with little communication between the band members, and at one point a frustrated Roddy Byers kicked a hole in the studio door, angering Rivers. Panter remembered, "Everybody was stood in different parts of this huge room with their equipment, no one talking. Jerry stormed out a couple of times virtually in tears and I went after him, 'Calm down, calm down'. It was hell to be around." Dammers said, "People weren't cooperating. 'Ghost Town' wasn't a free-for-all jam session. Every little bit was worked out and composed, all the different parts, I'd been working on it for at least a year, trying out every conceivable chord ... I can remember walking out of a rehearsal in total despair because Neville would not try the ideas. You know the brass bit is kind of jazzy, it has a dischord? I remember Lynval rushing into the control room while they were doing it going, 'No, no, no, it sounds wrong! Wrong! Wrong!'"

Collins wanted the song to sound more like a Sly and Robbie roots reggae track, so he brought a copy of a Sly and Robbie-produced single, "What a Feeling" by Gregory Isaacs, to the studio so that drummer John Bradbury could mimic the drum sound. He also suggested the two-handed shuffle rhythm played by Dammers on the Hammond organ throughout the song. Using just eight tracks limited Collins' recording possibilities, but as a reggae producer he decided to use the common reggae method of recording everything in mono: "As we were recording eight-track, I did go with a track plan. I wanted the drums in mono on one track, the bass in mono on another and the rhythm – that shuffle organ and Lynval's DI'd guitar – on another. They're the backbone of a reggae song. Then there was brass on another track, lead vocals on another, backing vocals on another, and various little bits and pieces dropped in ...'Ghost Town' is basically a mono record with stereo reverb and echo that I added in the mix ... The same applied to the brass: John [Rivers] put one mic in the middle of the room, placed Dick [Cuthell] and Rico [Rodriguez] in diagonal corners, and when we listened in the control room it sounded great. Recording simply in mono really helped the instruments balance themselves." However, there was a tense moment towards the end of recording when Dammers decided at the last minute that he wanted to add a flute to the song, and with no free tracks available Collins was forced to record the flute directly onto the track containing the previously recorded brass section, with the possibility that any error would have rendered the entire track unusable:

As it had not been decided where exactly the backing vocals would be used, Terry Hall, Staple, Golding and Dammers sang a full backing vocal track throughout the song, which Collins used to his advantage as the lyric "this town is coming like a ghost town" had become like a "hypnotic chant" by the end of the song.

Collins took a recording of the separate tracks back to his home in Tottenham in north London where he spent three weeks mixing the song. During this period Hall, Staple, Golding and Dammers all turned up at the house at various times to add further vocals. Since the song had no proper beginning or ending during recording at Woodbine Street, Collins recreated the idea of fading in over a sound effect, which he had used previously on "Lift Off", the B-side of "At the Club". To achieve the effect he wanted, Collins utilised a kit-built Transcendent 2000 synthesiser to create a "ghost" sound, which he used to fade in and out at the beginning and end of the track.

B-sides
The single had two B-sides, each written by a different member of the Specials. "Why?" is a plea for racial tolerance and was written by guitarist Lynval Golding in response to a violent racist attack he had suffered in July 1980 outside the Moonlight Club in West Hampstead in London, which had left him hospitalised with broken ribs. "Friday Night, Saturday Morning" was written by lead singer Terry Hall and describes a mundane night out in Coventry.

Music video
The music video, directed by Barney Bubbles, consists of bass player Panter driving the band around London in a 1961 Vauxhall Cresta, intercut with views of streets and buildings filmed from the moving vehicle, and ends with a shot of the band standing on the banks of the River Thames at low tide. The video's locations include driving through the Rotherhithe Tunnel and around semi-derelict areas of the East End as well as in Lothbury and Throgmorton Street in the financial district of the City of London in the early hours of daylight on Sunday morning, where the streets were deserted as it was the weekend. The shots of the band in the car were achieved by attaching a camera to the bonnet using a rubber sucker: Panter recalled that at one point the camera fell off (briefly seen in the finished video at 1:18) and scratched the car's paintwork, to the displeasure of the car's owner. The original Ghost Town car can be seen (and sat in) at the Coventry Music Museum.

Impact
Contemporaneous reviews identified the song's impact as an "instant musical editorial" on recent events (the 1981 England riots). Although initial reviews of the single in the UK music press were lukewarm, by the end of the year the song had won over the critics to be named "Single of the Year" in Melody Maker, NME and Sounds, the UK's top three weekly music magazines at the time. AllMusic's retrospective review of the original single argued that the song was the band's "crowning achievement".

The summer of 1981 saw riots in over 35 locations around the UK. In response to the linking of the song to these events, singer Terry Hall said, "When we recorded 'Ghost Town', we were talking about [1980]'s riots in Bristol and Brixton. The fact that it became popular when it did was just a weird coincidence." The song created resentment in Coventry where residents angrily rejected the characterisation of the city as a town in decline.

In the 1990s the song was featured in an episode of the Channel 4 sitcom Father Ted.

The song experienced a thematic resurgence on music streaming platforms in 2020, after lockdown orders were placed following the COVID-19 pandemic.

In December 2021, a commemorative plaque was affixed to the house where the former Woodbine Street recording studio was located. The plaque mentions "Ghost Town" was recorded there.

In 2022, it was included in the list "The story of NME in 70 (mostly) seminal songs" at number 19, for "Lacing ska and reggae with the amphetamine edge of new wave". Mark Beaumont praised the song and its "brooding evocation of Thatcher’s wasteland Britain".

Track listing

1981 release

1991 release (Ghost Town Revisited)

Personnel
The Specials
John Bradbury – drums
Roddy Radiation – guitar
Jerry Dammers – keyboards, Hammond organ, backing vocals
Lynval Golding – guitar, backing vocals, lead vocals on "Why?"
Terry Hall – lead vocals, backing vocals
Horace Panter – bass
Neville Staple – vocals

Additional personnel
Dick Cuthell – flugelhorn
Paul Heskett – flute
Rico Rodriguez – trombone

Chart positions

References

External links
Lyrics  to Ghost Town
A page about the single on a 2 Tone Records fansite
An interview about the song with John Collins, the producer

1981 singles
UK Singles Chart number-one singles
Protest songs
The Specials songs
Songs written by Jerry Dammers
2 Tone Records singles
1981 songs
Reggae rock songs
Songs about poverty
Songs about cities
Urban decay